Econofoods is a grocery chain located in the US which, at its peak, had stores in Minnesota, Wisconsin, the Upper Peninsula of Michigan, Iowa, Wyoming, South Dakota, and North Dakota. Econofoods was formerly a brand of SpartanNash, and was listed among its retail banners until November 2021.

All Econofoods stores in Michigan and two in Wisconsin were owned and operated by T & C Markets of Brillion, WI, but were subsequently sold to Minnesota-based grocery retailer, Coborn's in 2021, which rebranded the stores as Tadych's Marketplace Foods. As of 2022, only two stores remained under the Econofoods brand, with one located in Breckenridge, Minnesota and the other in its twin city of Wahpeton, North Dakota, located across the Red River of the North and its tributary, the Bois de Sioux River.

Econofoods stores are generally full service stores - with a pharmacy, bakery, video rental, floral services, deliveries, and on-site banking facilities.  Stores acquired by Coborn's were slated to maintain full-service operations, with Coborn's planning, as of December 2021, to retain the roughly 800 employees affected by the acquisition.

Econofoods also has three liquor stores in the two cities in which it continues to operate, with two in Wahpeton, ND (Econo Wine and Spirits and Chuck's Offsale), as well as one liquor store in Breckenridge, MN.

References

External links
 SpartanNash Company Web Site
 Tadych’s Marketplace Foods Web Site

Economy of the Midwestern United States
Supermarkets of the United States

Econofoods in Winona Minnesota 
Econofoods in Red Wing Minnesota